Grumbach or von Grumbach is a surname. Notable people with the surname include:

 Antoine Grumbach, French architect
 Argula von Grumbach (1492–1554?), Bavarian noblewoman
 Detlef Grumbach (born 1955), German author and journalist
 Doris Grumbach (1918–2022), American novelist, biographer, literary critic, and essayist
 Kevin Grumbach, American physician and academic
 Melvin M. Grumbach (1925–2016), American pediatrician and academic
 Wilhelm von Grumbach (1503–1567), German adventurer